Socialist Republican Party may refer to:

Independent Socialist Republican Party, Senegal
Irish Socialist Republican Party
Radical Socialist Republican Party, Spain
Socialist Republican Party (Bolivia)
Socialist Republican Party (Ireland)
Socialist Republican Party (Kerala), India
Socialist Republican Party (Sudan)
Socialist Republican Party of Ceará, Brazil

See also
Socialist Party (disambiguation)